Anna Rubin (born 1946) is an American composer of electroacoustic and instrumental music.

Biography
Anna Rubin studied with composers Mel Powell, Earle Brown, Pauline Oliveros, and Paul Lansky, and graduated with a doctorate in composition from Princeton University. After completing her studies, she taught composition at the Oberlin Conservatory of Music at Oberlin College. She also taught at Lafayette College and in 2002 took a teaching position at the University of Maryland, Baltimore County.

Rubin is a member of the American Music Center, is a co-founder of the Independent Composers Association of LA, serves on the editorial board of Perspectives of New Music, and has served as president of the International Alliance for Women in Music.

Rubin is the author of professional articles on the work of composer Francis Dhomont.

Honors and awards
Two awards, Maryland State Arts Council
Fellow, National Orchestral Association
Delta Ensemble Gaudeamus Prize for De Nacht: Lament for Malcolm X, 1984
Jury prize, Aether Festival #1 - International Radio Art/Radio Station KUNM, Albuquerque, NM, for Family Stories: Sophie, Sally, with Laurie Hollander

Selected works
Rubin composes for chamber ensembles, orchestra, chorus, digital audio and live electronics. Selected works include:

Crying the Laughing and Golden for tape (1982–1983)
De Nacht: Lament for Malcolm X (1984)
Hiding Faces, Open Faces for viola, electronic soundtrack and video (1988)
Viola a Tre for 3 violas (1988)
Remembering for mezzo-soprano, piano and tape (1989)
Seachanges for viola da gamba and tape (1996)
Family Stories: Sophie, Sally (1998)

References

External links
Home page
UMBC Faculty page
I Resound Press

1946 births
Living people
20th-century classical composers
American music educators
American women music educators
Jewish classical composers
American women classical composers
American classical composers
Electroacoustic music composers
Princeton University alumni
Oberlin College faculty
Lafayette College faculty
University of Maryland, Baltimore County faculty
American women in electronic music
20th-century American women musicians
20th-century American composers
20th-century women composers
American women academics
21st-century American women